Robert Van Zeebroeck (born 31 October 1909, date of death unknown) was a Belgian figure skater.

He won the bronze medal in the singles event at the 1928 Winter Olympics, became one of the youngest male figure skating Olympic medalists. He also participated with his partner Josy Van Leberghe in the pairs competition where they finished sixth.

Results

Men's singles

Pairs
(with Josy Van Leberghe)

References

External links
 
 

1909 births
Year of death missing
Belgian male single skaters
Belgian male pair skaters
Olympic figure skaters of Belgium
Figure skaters at the 1928 Winter Olympics
Olympic bronze medalists for Belgium
Olympic medalists in figure skating
Medalists at the 1928 Winter Olympics